Galathée is the French form of the feminine given name Galatea. It may refer to:

 French frigate Galathée (1779), a French Navy sailing ship
 Galathée-class frigate, of which the frigate was the lead ship
 Galathée (opera), an 1852 opera by Victor Massé
 Galathée, a 1911 film directed by Georges Denola
 Galathée, an underwater habitat

See also
 Galatea (disambiguation)